Elmer H. Antonsen (17 November 1929 – 25 August 2008) was an American philologist who specialized in Germanic studies. Antonsen was born in Glens Falls, New York on 17 November 1929. He earned degrees in German at Union College where he took the B.A. degree, and then at University of Illinois at Urbana–Champaign where he studied under Ernst Alfred Philippson for his doctorate.  He taught German Studies, Germanic Philology and Germanic Linguistics at the University of Iowa in the 1960s before moving back to the University of Illinois to eventually rise to Full Professor. He was visiting professor at the University of Göttingen in 1988. He retired in 1996, and was awarded professor emeritus status. He was a known expert on runology. 

Antonsen died in Urbana, Illinois on 25 August 2008.

Selected works
 A Concise Grammar of the Older Runic Inscriptions, (Max Niemeyer Verlag, Tübingen 1975)
 The Grimm Brothers and the Germanic Past, Antonsen, Elmer, James W. Marchand and Ladislav Zgusta (eds.), (John Benjamins, Amsterdam 1990)
 STAEFCRAEFT: Studies in Germanic Linguistics, Antonsen & Hock (eds.), (John Benjamins, Amsterdam 1991)
 Runes and Germanic Linguistics, (Mouton de Gruyter, Berlin/New York 2002)
 Elements of German: Phonology and Morphology, (University of Alabama Press, Tuscaloosa 2007)

Sources

 Bernard Mees: "Elmer Antonsen as a Runologist." In: Mindy MacLeod, Marco Bianchi, Henrik Williams (Hrsg.): Reading Runes: Proceedings of the Eighth International Symposium on Runes and Runic Inscriptions, Nyköping, Sweden, 2–6 September 2014. Institutionen för nordiska språk vid Uppsala universitet, Uppsala 2021, 109–124. <http://www.diva-portal.org/smash/get/diva2:1540869/FULLTEXT01.pdf>
 Wilfried Kürschner: Elmer H. Antonsen. In: Linguistenhandbuch A–L, Günter Narr Verlag, Tübingen 1997, S. 15f. with a photo

1929 births
2008 deaths
American philologists
Germanic studies scholars
Germanists
Professors of German in the United States
Linguists of Germanic languages
Old Norse studies scholars
People from Glens Falls, New York
Runologists
University of Illinois Urbana-Champaign faculty
20th-century philologists
Linguists from the United States